Sarah Jane Cunningham and Suzie Villandry-Freeman are an American television writing and producing team. They began their careers writing for the Nickelodeon animated series The Wild Thornberrys. Before moving on to the fellow Nicktoons shows Rugrats and As Told by Ginger. Some of their other television credits include Even Stevens, Cory in the House, South of Nowhere, Everybody Hates Chris, True Jackson, VP, Melissa & Joey and That's So Raven. They were nominated for Primetime Emmy Award for their work on the latter series.

Credits
 The Wild Thornberrys (2000, writers)
 Rugrats (2001, writers)
 As Told by Ginger (2001, writers)
 Even Stevens (2000–2003, producers and writers)
 Family Affair (2002–2003, writers, 3 episodes)
 That's So Raven (2003–2005, producers and writers, 6 episodes)
 Less Than Perfect (2005, writers, 1 episode)
 South of Nowhere (2007, writers, 1 episode)
 Cory in the House, (2007–2008, 2 episodes)
 Everybody Hates Chris (2009, 1 episode)
 The Assistants (2009, 2 episodes)
 True Jackson, VP (2009–2010, writers, 6 episodes)
 Melissa & Joey (2011-2013, producers and writers)
Last Man Standing (2012-2013, writers, 2 episodes, producers)
 I Didn't Do It (2014, writers, 3 episodes, producers)
 Nicky, Ricky, Dicky & Dawn (2014-2016, writers, 3 episodes, co-executive producers)
 School of Rock (2016-2018, writers, 4 episodes, co-executive producers)
 Wayne (2018, writers, 1 episode, co-executive producers)
 Punky Brewster (2021, writers, 2 episodes, co-executive producers)
 iCarly (2021, writers, 1 episode, co-executive producers)

References

External links

1967 births
1969 births
American television writers
American women television producers
Living people
Television people from London
People from Sarasota, Florida
Screenwriting duos
American women television writers
Screenwriters from Florida
Television producers from Florida
21st-century American women